The Sibylline Oracles (sometimes called the pseudo-Sibylline Oracles) are a collection of oracular utterances written in Greek hexameters ascribed to the Sibyls, prophetesses who uttered divine revelations in a frenzied state. Fourteen books and eight fragments of Sibylline Oracles survive, in an edition of the 6th or 7th century AD. They are not to be confused with the original Sibylline Books of the ancient Etruscans and Romans which were burned by order of the Roman general Flavius Stilicho in the 4th century AD. Instead, the text is an "odd pastiche" of Hellenistic and Roman mythology interspersed with Jewish, Gnostic and early Christian legend.

The Sibylline Oracles are a valuable source for information about classical mythology and early first millennium Gnostic, Hellenistic Jewish and Christian beliefs. Some apocalyptic passages scattered throughout seem to foreshadow themes of the Book of Revelation and other apocalyptic literature. The oracles have undergone extensive editing, re-writing, and redaction as they came to be exploited in wider circles.

One passage has an acrostic, spelling out a Christian code-phrase with the first letters of successive lines.

Introduction
The Sibylline Oracles in their existing form are a chaotic medley. They consist of 12 books (or 14) of various authorship, date, and religious conception. The final arrangement, thought to be due to an unknown editor of the 6th century AD (Alexandre), does not determine identity of authorship, time, or religious belief; many of the books are merely arbitrary groupings of unrelated fragments.

These oracles were anonymous in origin and as such were apt to modification and enlargement at pleasure by Hellenistic Jews and by Christians for missionary purposes. Celsus called Christians Σιβυλλισται (sibyl-mongers or believers in sibyls) because of prophecies preached among them, especially those in the book of Revelation. The preservation of the entire collection is due to Christian writers.

Sources for the Sibylline texts
The oldest of the surviving Sibylline oracles seem to be books 3-5, which were composed partly by Jews in Alexandria.  The third oracle seems to have been composed in the reign of Ptolemy VI Philometor.  Books 1-2 may have been written by Christians, though again there may have been a Jewish original that was adapted to Christian purposes.

All the oracles seem to have undergone later revision, enrichment, and adaptation by editors and authors of different religions, who added similar texts, all in the interests of their respective religions.  The Sibylline oracles are therefore a pastiche of Greek and Roman pagan mythology, employing motifs of Homer and Hesiod; Judeo-Christian legends such as the Garden of Eden, Noah and the Tower of Babel;  Gnostic and early Christian homilies and eschatological writings; thinly veiled references to historical figures such as Alexander the Great and Cleopatra, as well as many allusions to the events of the later Roman Empire, often portraying Rome in a negative light.

Some have suggested that the surviving texts may include some fragments or remnants of the Sibylline Books with a legendary provenance from the Cumaean Sibyl, which had been kept in temples in Rome. The original oracular books, kept in Rome, were accidentally destroyed in a fire in 83 BC, which resulted in an attempt in 76 BC to recollect them when the Roman senate sent envoys throughout the world to discover copies.  This official copy existed until at least AD 405, but little is known of their contents.

That use of the Sibylline Oracles was not always exclusive to Christians is shown by an extract from Book III concerning the Tower of Babel as quoted by the Jewish historian Flavius Josephus, in the late 1st century AD.

The Christian apologist Athenagoras of Athens, writing A Plea for the Christians to  Marcus Aurelius in ca. AD 176, quoted the same section of the extant Oracles verbatim, in the midst of a lengthy series of classical and pagan references including Homer and Hesiod, and stated several times that all these works should already be familiar to the Roman Emperor.

Varro enumerated ten sybils: Persian, Libyan, Delphic, Cimmerian, Erythrean, Samian, Cumean, Hellospontian, Phyrgian, and Tiburtine. The list omits the Hebrew, Chaldean, and Egyptian Sybils.
The Suda repeats this list but identifies the Persian Sybil with the Hebrew.

The sibyls themselves, and the so-called Sibylline oracles, were often referred to by other early Church fathers; Theophilus, Bishop of Antioch (ca. 180), Clement of Alexandria (ca. 200), Lactantius (ca. 305), and Augustine (ca. 400), all knew various versions of the pseudo-Sibylline collections, quoted them or referred to them in paraphrase, and were willing to Christianize them, by as simple means as inserting "Son of God" into a passage, as Lactantius:

"The Erythraean Sibyl" in the beginning of her song, which she commenced by the help of the Most High God, proclaims the Son of God as leader and commander of all in these verses:

All-nourishing Creator, who in all
Sweet breath implanted, and made God the guide of all."

Some fragmentary verses that do not appear in the collections that survive are only known because they were quoted by a Church Father. Justin Martyr (ca. 150), if he is truly the author of the Exhortation to the Greeks, gives such a circumstantial account of the Cumaean sibyl that the Address is quoted here at the Cumaean sibyl's entry.  The Catholic Encyclopedia states, "Through the decline and disappearance of paganism, however, interest in them gradually diminished and they ceased to be widely read or circulated, though they were known and used during the Middle Ages in both the East and the West." Thus, a student may find echoes of their imagery and style in much early medieval literature.

These books, in spite of their pagan content, have sometimes been described as part of the Pseudepigrapha. They do not appear in the canonical lists of any Church.

Manuscripts and editions
The text has been transmitted in fourteen "books", preserved in two distinct manuscript traditions, one containing books 1–8, the other 9–14. However, "book 9" consists of material from books 1–8 and "book 10" is identical to "book 4", so that the edition by Collins (1983) contains only books 1–8 and 11–14. The main manuscripts date to the 14th to 16th centuries (Collins 1983:321):

group φ: books 1–8 with an anonymous prologue
Z: Cod. Hierosolymitanus Sabaiticus 419 (late 14th c.)
A: Cod. Vindobonensis hist gr. XCVI 6 (15th c.) 
P: Cod. Monacensis 351 (15th c.) 
B: Cod. Bodleianus Baroccianus 103 (late 15th c.)
S: Cod. Scorialensis II Σ 7 (late 15th c.) 
D: Cod. Vallicellianus gr. 46 (16th c.)
group ψ: books 1–8, without prologue
F: Cod. Laurentianus plut. XI 17 (15th c.) 
R: Cod. Parisinus 2851 (late 15th c.) 
L: Cod. Parisinus 2850 (1475) 
T: Cod. Toletanus Cat 88.44 (c. 1500)
group Ω: books 9–14
M: Cod. Ambrosianus E64 sup. (15th c.)
Q: Cod. Vaticanus 1120 (14th c.) 
V: Cod. Vaticanus 743 (14th c.) 
H: Cod. Monacensis gr. 312 (1541)
To this may be added the ample quotations found in the writings of the early Church Fathers.

In 1545 Xystus Betuleius (Sixt Birck of Augsburg) published at Basel an edition based on ms. P, and the next year a version set in Latin verse appeared. Better manuscripts were used by Johannes Opsopaeus, whose edition appeared at Paris in 1599. Later editions include those by Servaas Galle (Servatius: Amsterdam 1689) and by Andrea Gallandi in his Bibliotheca Veterum Patrum (Venice, 1765, 1788).
Books 11–14 were edited only in the 19th century.
In 1817 Angelo Mai edited a further book, from a manuscript in the Biblioteca Ambrosiana at Milan (Codex Ambrosianus) and later he discovered four more books, in the Vatican Library, none of which were continuations of the eight previously printed, but an independent collection. These are numbered XI to XIV in later editions. Several fragments of oracles taken from the works of Theophilus and Lactantius, printed in the later editions, show that even more Sibylline oracles formerly existed. In the course of the 19th century, better texts also became available for the parts previously published.

Contents
The so-called Sibylline oracles are couched in classical hexameter verses. The contents are of the most varied character and for the most part contain references to peoples, kingdoms, cities, rulers, temples, etc. It is futile to attempt to read any order into their plan or any connected theme.

Patrick Healy Catholic Encyclopedia (1912) suggests that their present arrangement represents the caprice of different owners or collectors who brought them together from various sources... Though there are occasionally verses which are truly poetical and sublime, the general character of the Sibylline Oracles is mediocre. The order in which the books are numbered does not represent their relative antiquity, nor has the most searching criticism been able accurately to determine how much is Christian and how much Jewish.

Healy continues that Book IV is generally considered to embody the oldest portions of the oracles, and while many of the older critics saw in it elements which were considered to be Christian, it is now looked on as completely Jewish. Book V has given rise to many divergent opinions, some claiming it as Jewish, others as the work of a Christian Jew, and others as being largely interpolated by a Christian. It contains so little that can be considered Christian that it can safely be set down as Jewish. Books VI and VII are admittedly of Christian origin. Some authors (Mendelssohn, Alexandre, Geffcken) describe Book VI as an heretical hymn, but this contention has no evidence in its favour. It dates most probably from the third century AD. Books I and II are regarded as a Christian revision of a Jewish original. Book VIII offers peculiar difficulties; the first 216 verses are most likely the work of a second century AD Jew, while the latter part (verses 217-500) beginning with an acrostic on the symbolic Christian word Icthus is undoubtedly Christian, and dates most probably from the third century AD. In the form in which they are now found the other four books are probably the work of Christian authors. Books XII and XIII are from the same pen, XII being a revision of a Jewish original. Book XI might have been written either by a Christian or a Jew in the third century AD, and Book XIV of the same doubtful provenance dates from the fourth century AD. The general conclusion is that Books VI, VII, and XIII and the latter part of Book VIII are wholly Christian. Books I, II, XI, XII, XIII, and XIV received their present form from a Christian. The peculiar Christian circle in which these compositions originated cannot be determined, neither can it be asserted what motive prompted their composition except as a means of Christian propaganda.

See also
Alexander Polyhistor
Hebrew Sibyl
Jewish eschatology
Vaticinia ex eventu describes the phenomenon of pretended oracles written after the event.
Wives aboard the Ark

References

Citations

Sources 

 
 
 
 

 Attribution

Further reading
J. Geffcken, Die Oracula Sibyllina, Leipzig, Hinrichs, 1902.
A. Peretti, La Sibilla babilonese nella propaganda ellenistica, Firenze, La Nuova Italia, 1942.
V. Nikiprowetzky, La troisième Sibylle, Paris, La Haye, 1970.
J. J. Collins, The Sibylline Oracles of Egyptian Judaism, Missoula 1974.
A. Grafton, Higher Criticism Ancient and Modern: The Lamentable Death of Hermes and the Sibyls, in: The Uses of Greek and Latin. Historical Essays, ed. by A.C. Dionisotti, A. Grafton and J. Kraye, London 1988, pp. 155–170.
H.W. Parke, Sibyls and Sibylline Prophecy in Classical Antiquity, London, Routledge, 1988.
I. Cervelli, Questioni sibilline, «Studi storici» 34, 1993, pp. 895–1001.
M. Bracali, Sebastiano Castellione e l'edizione dei Sibyllina Oracula, «Rinascimento» 36, 1996, pp. 319–349.
R. Buitenwerf, Book III of the Sibylline Oracles and Its Social Setting, Leiden-Boston, Brill, 2003.
C. Schiano, Il secolo della Sibilla. Momenti della tradizione cinquecentesca degli «Oracoli Sibillini», Bari, edizioni di Pagina, 2005.
J. Fischer, Folia ventis turbata – Sibyllinische Orakel und der Gott Apollon zwischen später Republik und augusteischem Principat (Studien zur Alten Geschichte 33), Göttingen 2022.

External links

Milton S. Terry, The Sibylline Oracles (complete text, at Elfinspell)
Milton S. Terry, The sibylline oracles: only those fragments that are quoted in Patristic writings, annotated and set in context, including the long preface of the (6th century?) editor
The Sibylline oracles , Books III-V, Translated by the Rev. H. N. Bate, M.A., 1918 (a searchable facsimile at the University of Georgia Libraries; DjVu & layered PDF  format)
The Sibylline Oracles.  Translated from Greek into Blank English Verse.  New Edition Revised after the Text of Ruch. (1899) Translated by Milton S. Terry.  Digital Facsimile. (PDF)

Ancient Roman religion
Classical oracles
Prophecy
Old Testament pseudepigrapha
Apocalyptic literature
Occult books
Jewish apocrypha